Our New Orleans: A Benefit Album for the Gulf Coast is an album which presents songs recorded in September and October 2005, shortly after the failure of misdesigned levees flooded New Orleans in the wake of Hurricane Katrina (see: Effect of Hurricane Katrina on New Orleans)  With the destruction of their hometown fresh in their minds, New Orleans artists set about making music that directly acknowledges the city.

Funds from the sale of the record is donated to Habitat For Humanity to aid those affected by the Hurricane Katrina disaster.

Track listing
"Yes We Can Can" – Allen Toussaint
"World I Never Made" – Dr. John
"Back Water Blues" – Irma Thomas
"Gather By The River" – Davell Crawford
"Cryin' In The Streets" – Buckwheat Zydeco
"Canal Street Blues" – Dr. Michael White
"Medley" – The Wild Magnolias
"When The Saints Go Marching In" – Eddie Bo
"My Feet Can't Fail Me Now" – Dirty Dozen Brass Band
"Tou' Les Jours C'est Pas La Meme" – Carol Fran
"L'ouragon" – BeauSoleil
"Do You Know What It Means To Miss New Orleans" – Preservation Hall Jazz Band
"Prayer For New Orleans" – Charlie Miller
"What a Wonderful World" – Wardell Quezergue Orchestra – (featuring Donald Harrison)
"Tipitina And Me" – Allen Toussaint
"Louisiana 1927" – Randy Newman, Louisiana Philharmonic Orchestra

2005 compilation albums
Hurricane Katrina disaster relief charity albums